Wadi Allaqi, also transliterated as Wadi Allaqui or Wadi Alalaqi, is a wadi (dry river) in southern Egypt. It begins in Sudan below Halaib Triangle, and its mouth is south of Aswan on the eastern shore of Lake Nasser.

Wadi Allaqi is the major dry river in the southeastern part of the Eastern Desert of Egypt, draining the area from the hills near the Red Sea to the valley of the Nile. As of 1989 the area has been a nature reserve managed by the Egyptian Environmental Affairs Agency. It was declared a Biosphere Reserve by UNESCO in 1993.

Wadi Allaqi is famous for gold and rock inscriptions. A noteworthy rock inscription site is found at Umm Ashira. A Middle Kingdom of Egypt fortress was built at Quban, near the original waddi's mouth, with another fortress built at Ikkur. A stela attributed to New Kingdom of Egypt Ramesses II discovered near Quban references the search and discovery of water for gold laborers. That well is located 60 km into Wadi Allaqi, near Umm Ashira, and past the now flooded portion of the wadi now constituting Lake Nasser. Gold deposits and mining are noteworthy in the upper parts of Wadi Allaqi, particularly at Hairiri, Heimur, Umm Garaiyat, Marahig, Seiga, Shoshoba, and Abu Fas. Gold mining continued in the Early Arab Period, especially under the rule of Ahmad ibn Tulun. Of note are two forts built during this period at Derahib.

See also
Arabian-Nubian Shield

Notes

External links
UNESCO: Biosphere Reserve Information
 Ministry of Environment Egyptian Environmental Affairs Agency - Natural Protectorates Description

National parks of Egypt
Allaqi
Biosphere reserves of Egypt
Allaqi
Nature conservation in Egypt